The Battle of Goodenough Island (24 – 27 October 1942) took place in the South West Pacific Area (SWPA) during World War II.

Allied Forces

Ground Forces
2/12th Battalion
2/5th Field Ambulance
No. 2 Anti-aircraft Platoon
Detachment J, Section Signals, 7th Division
Transport Platoon
Detachment Mortars
Detachment Australian Army Service Corps
Captain Burkholder (United States Army Service of Supply, New Guinea)
Lieutenant Humphrey (8th Fighter Group, United States Army Air Forces)

Naval Forces

Task Force 44 (Covering Force)
Cruiser
USS Phoenix (flagship)
Destroyers
USS Bagley
USS Selfridge
USS Mugford
Transport Force
HMAS Arunta
HMAS Stuart
Ketch Matona
Ketch McLaren King
Ketch Tierno
3 captured Japanese barges
2 power driven whale boats

Japanese Forces
5th Sasebo Special Naval Landing Force
detachment 14th Pioneer Unit
detachment 15th Pioneer Unit

Notes

World War II orders of battle